Mogamad Farouk Mayman (born 3 May 1999) is a South African water polo player. He competed in the 2020 Summer Olympics.

References

1999 births
Living people
South African male water polo players
Olympic water polo players of South Africa
Water polo players at the 2020 Summer Olympics
Sportspeople from Cape Town